Andrzej Józef Tkacz (born September 20, 1946) is a former Polish ice hockey goaltender. He played for the Poland men's national ice hockey team at the 1972 Winter Olympics in Sapporo, and the 1976 Winter Olympics in Innsbruck.

References

1946 births
Living people
Ice hockey players at the 1972 Winter Olympics
Ice hockey players at the 1976 Winter Olympics
Olympic ice hockey players of Poland
Polish ice hockey goaltenders
Sportspeople from Katowice